{{DISPLAYTITLE:C19H27NO}}
The molecular formula C19H27NO (molar mass: 285.42 g/mol, exact mass: 285.2093 u) may refer to:

 Ciprefadol
 Pentazocine